La Dueña is a 2012 Argentine miniseries. It is a blockbuster starring Mirtha Legrand, who worked on this series after 46 years of retirement from acting in television.

Plot
Sofía Ponte is a successful businesswoman, heading an important cosmetics firm. She does not trust her sons and heirs, and organizes a plot to see which of them are trustworthy. Her granddaughter Amparo loses her parents in a plane accident, and begins a romance with Félix, the son of the pilot. Félix takes a job at the firm, and secretly investigates the plane crash, suspecting that it was not an accident.

Cast
 Mirtha Legrand as Sofía Ponte de Lacroix
 Florencia Bertotti as Amparo Lacroix
 Benjamín Vicuña as Esteban Salerno/Félix Fernández
 Raúl Taibo as Juan Lacroix Ponte
 Juan Gil Navarro as Federico Lacroix Ponte
 Fabián Vena as Diego Lacroix Ponte
 Claudia Lapacó as Teresa Fernández
 Federico D'Elía as Hernán Verges
 Andrea Frigerio as Lourdes Rivero de Lacroix
 Juan Pedro Lanzani as Eliseo Lacroix Rivero
 Brenda Gandini as Delfina Lacroix Rivero
 Carlos Portaluppi as Sergio Matienzo
 Jorgelina Aruzzi as Daniela Pereyra Rossi
 Manuela Pal as Magdalena "Maggy" Rodríguez Costa
 Alfredo Casero as Oliverio Carranza
 Mónica Cabrera as Helena Rossi
 Jorge D'Elía as Martín Braun
 Dolores Sarmiento as Mariela Echegoyen
 Daniela Aita as Nina Marini
 Graciela Dufau as Una amiga de Sofía
 Juan Ignacio Machado as Un matón
 Nacha Guevara as Carmen Salguero Solar
 Enrique Pinti as Dante Olivos Peña
 Daniel Rabinovich as Salvador Santos
 Juana Viale as Cecilia Peralta Ramos
 Sebastián Estevanez as Marcos Guerrero
 Héctor Giovine as Milton Lacroix
 Enrique Liporace as Renzo Pereyra Lucena
 Julia Calvo as La Cura
 Veronica Mertel as Valeria Kantz

Production
Mirtha Legrand began her career as a successful actress, and retired in 1965. She began to work as a TV host, in Almorzando con Mirtha Legrand, a talk show themed as a dinner, which lasted for several years. Her last previous acting work was in a stage play in 1990; she had not appeared on television as an actress for 46 years. La Dueña was scripted by Nacho Viale, grandson of Mirtha Legrand. She did not like the idea of acting at first, because of her age, but soon reconsidered and accepted. The original proposed name was "La Doña" ("Doña" is the Spanish female form of the honorific title "Don"), and the main character was scripted as the president of a news agency. The producer Martín Kweller proposed the changes to the name used and the cosmetics firm.

The cast of the miniseries features several of the most important actors of Argentina.

The program was initially scheduled to run on Sundays at 22:00 on Telefe, competing with the investigative journalism television program Periodismo para todos on channel 13. However, it was finally scheduled for Wednesdays at 22:30, competing with Bailando 2012. The premiere achieved almost 30.9 rating points.

Reception
The miniseries was praised by La Nación for the scripts and the production. The shooting, the locations, the cast and the editing have good quality. Although the point of main interest for the audience is Legrand's acting, the miniseries does not rely solely on her.

The newspaper also criticised the use of outdated cliches at certain points in the plot, the presence of a comic relief character in a dramatic work, and the excessive use of metafictional allusions to Mirtha Legrand herself in the Sofía Conte character.

References

External links

 
 Official site 

2010s Argentine television series
2012 telenovelas
2012 in Argentina
2012 Argentine television series debuts
2012 Argentine television series endings
Telefe telenovelas
Spanish-language telenovelas
Television shows set in Buenos Aires
Argentine television miniseries